Longshan County is a county of Hunan Province, China, it is under the administration of Xiangxi Autonomous Prefecture.

Located on the western margin of the province and the north western Xiangxi, it is immediately adjacent to the borders of Chongqing Municipality and Hubei Province. The county is bordered to the northeast by Sangzhi County, to the east by Yongshun County, to the southeast and the south by Baojing County, to the west by Youyang County of Chongqing, Laifeng County and Xuan'en County of Hubei. The county has 12 towns, 5 townships and 4 subdistricts  under its jurisdiction, the county seat is Min'an Subdistrict.

History
The 2014 Hunan military training incident occurred at a secondary school in Longshan County.

Administrative divisions
Longshan has 3 subdistricts, 11 towns, and 20 townships:
Subdistricts:
Min'an
Huatang
Xincheng
Towns:
Shigao
Ciyantang
Hongyanxi
Xichehe
Miao'ertan
Longtou
Liye
Zhaoshi
Guitang
Shipai
Dianfang
Townships:
Luota
Xiluo
Wantang
Baiyang
Xinglongjie
Sanyuan
Tongche
Da'an
Shuitianba
Wuya
Mengbi
Maoping
Tasha
Neixi
Jiashi
Tasha
Nongche
Laoxing
Jiaba
Zanguo

Transportation
China National Highway 209

Climate

References

External links
Official website of Longshan County Government

 
County-level divisions of Hunan
Xiangxi Tujia and Miao Autonomous Prefecture